Air Jordan was an airline based in Jordan.  It was founded in 1950.  In 1958, it acquired Arab Airways Jerusalem and changed its name to Air Jordan of the Holy Land.  It ceased operating in 1961.

The airline was owned by American and Jordanian business interests.

See also

 Royal Jordanian

References

Defunct airlines of Jordan
1950 establishments in Jordan
1961 disestablishments in Jordan
Airlines established in 1950
Airlines disestablished in 1961